Mike Gallagher (born April 7, 1960) is an American Radio Host and conservative political commentator. He is the host of The Mike Gallagher Show, a nationally syndicated radio program that airs throughout the United States on Salem Radio Network and is also a FOX News Channel Contributor and guest host. According to Talkers magazine, Gallagher is the ninth most-listened-to radio talk show host in the United States.

Career

Radio

As a 17-year-old high school senior in Dayton, Ohio, Gallagher talked his way into an on-air shift at WAVI. From there he joined WFBC in Greenville, South Carolina, eventually becoming station manager. He then became an on-air host in Albany, New York, on WGY. Gallagher went on to New York City, where he spent two years as morning drive host on WABC.

In 1998, The Mike Gallagher Show was launched nationally with 12 radio stations. As of early 2011, Gallagher was the sixth most listened-to talk radio host in America with over four million weekly listeners. He is heard daily in New York City, Los Angeles, Chicago, Dallas, Houston, Detroit, Atlanta, and Philadelphia as well as in small, medium and major markets all over the country. According to the Benchmark Company, he is the 8th most-recognized talk radio personality in America. Gallagher has also been featured in numerous magazines and newspapers including The New York Times, The Wall Street Journal, Time, and Forbes. Talkers Magazine has named Gallagher one of the 100 most influential talk hosts in America for eleven consecutive years.

Gallagher's show hosts many high-profile politicians as guests, including former Speaker of the House Newt Gingrich, former US President George W. Bush, Speaker of the House John Boehner, Republican presidential candidate John McCain during his 2008 electoral run, Vice President Dick Cheney while in office, and then-Secretary of Defense Donald Rumsfeld.

Television
Gallagher co-hosted a morning news program with Dawn Meadows on Dayton's then-NBC affiliate WKEF in 1983. He is a Fox News Channel contributor and sometimes co-host, making frequent appearances on many Fox News Channel shows.

Writing
In the summer of 2005, he authored Surrounded by Idiots:  Fighting Liberal Lunacy in America (2005, William Morrow), which became a New York Times bestseller (#27 on the extended bestseller list). The Times reviewed the book writing, "You might disagree with the man's politics, but dang, you gotta love a guy who slaughters a steer live on the radio just to annoy the ideologues at People for the Ethical Treatment of Animals, then gives the meat to the poor. Checkmate. Fans of Gallagher will love the book, and even those liberal loons might enjoy reading it just to play Spot the Inconsistencies." On his radio show, he announced he was writing a book called 50 Things Liberals Love to Hate which was released August 28, 2012. The book was reviewed by former Speaker Newt Gingrich, who said of the book that it, "is smart, funny, and uses satire and wit to take apart the left. If Jon Stewart had writers who were conservative, they'd write a book like this." On September 10, 2012 Gallagher gave a reading of his new book at the Richard Nixon Presidential Library.

Salem News Channel
Mike Gallagher also broadcasts on the Salem News Channel. His show began streaming on the Salem News Channel in November 2021.

Philanthropy and causes
On May 8, 2006 Gallagher used his show to raise money for the creation of homes in poverty-stricken areas of Jamaica in conjunction with Food for the Poor, during a live broadcast in the Jamaican national capital. Gallagher is also the namesake of his main charity, Gallagher's Army: The Mike Gallagher Show Charitable Foundation, which he founded in 2005 after he began asking his listeners and others to support the families of American military families. In 2008 Gallagher expanded his efforts by founding the Gallagher's Army: Fallen Officer Fund, which gathers funds from his listeners and others to support the families of police officers who have fallen in the line of duty.

Gallagher has made his views on the protesting of American war dead upon their return from theatres of war, using his air time to try and prevent such protests from taking place. On October 6, 2006, Gallagher convinced the controversial Topeka, Kansas-based Westboro Baptist Church to appear on air with an hour of air time in exchange for not picketing a funeral for victims from the West Nickel Mines School shooting near Nickel Mines, Pennsylvania. Initially, Gallagher offered the organization money not to picket the funeral. With this gesture being accused of being blood money, the syndicated radio host gave the church an hour to appear on air. The Amish funerals went on peacefully after the contract signed with WBC stipulated a $500,000 fine if there were picketers anywhere near the funerals.

Following plans by the Westboro Baptist Church to protest funerals of victims of the Virginia Tech massacre, Gallagher offered the group three hours of airtime in exchange for an agreement not to protest these funerals. The WBC was the in-studio guests of Gallagher's program for its entirety on April 24, 2007.  He has made a similar agreement with Westboro concerning possible protests at the funerals of those killed in Tucson, Arizona on January 8, 2011, despite the fact that emergency legislation passed on January 12, 2011 makes such protests illegal in Arizona.

Controversy
In December 2006 Gallagher made a controversial comment on Fox News, in response to a discussion of whether film actors and television personalities should be held to account for public statements they make against the government in a time of war, specifically Joy Behar's comparison of then Secretary of Defense Donald Rumsfeld to Adolf Hitler. Gallagher stated that, "I think we should round up all of these folks. Round up Joy Behar. Round up Matt Damon, who last night on MSNBC attacked George Bush and Dick Cheney. Round up [Keith] Olbermann. Take the whole bunch of them and put them in a detention camp until this war is over because they're a bunch of traitors."

Gallagher has come under fire of accusations of racism and Islamophobia after stating that airports ought to have a "Muslims Only" line in the wake of the 9/11 attacks, saying "It's time to have a Muslims check-point line in America's airports and have Muslims be scrutinized. You better believe it, it's time."

Personal life
Gallagher was born in Dayton, Ohio. He attended Chaminade-Julienne High School in downtown Dayton (graduating in 1978), where he was active in the school radio and TV station, theater (he had lead roles during all four years of school), the school band and chorus. Gallagher is of Irish descent. In 2008, his wife Denise died one day shy of her 52nd birthday, from endometrial cancer.

From September 6-11, 2011 Gallagher made a week-long cameo in the Broadway show Memphis, stating it was the culmination of a lifelong dream.

References

External links
 Gallagher's official website
 Gallagher 2002 CNN interview transcript
 

1960 births
Living people
American talk radio hosts
Christians from Ohio
Christians from New York (state)
Fox News people
People from Albany, New York
People from Dayton, Ohio
Wright State University alumni